Sayyid ul Sadaat Khwaja Sayyid Mir Khawand Mahmud ibn Sharifuddin Gilani-Naqshbandi Al-Hasani wal HusseiniKhatme Ziarate Sharife hazrat eshan Bukhari(written and investigated by Mian Ahmad Bader Akhlaq(BSC)) printed the second time in 1988 Writer and inspector Mian Muhammad Hasan Akhlaq(M.Km) 1988 company: Koperatis Lahorin, known as Hazrat Ishaan Shah Saheb (1563 — 5 November 1642) was a Sufi Saint from Bukhara, Uzbekistan.

Ancestry 
Hazrat Ishaan was a Sayyid, signifying his direct descent from the Islamic prophet Muhammad (in this case through his daughter Fatima al Zahra and his son in law and cousin Ali ibn Abu Talib).

Paternal descendance 
Two paternal Sayyid lineages of him are currently known. From one line he is a direct descendant of the seventh Imam Musa al Kadhim, through his son Ibrahim al Murtadha and of the well known Sufi master Khwaja Sayyid Mir Alauddin Atar. Sayyid Alauddin Atar was the successor and son in law of Hazrat Bahauddin Naqshband. Therefore, Hazrat Ishaan is also from the progeny of Hazrat Bahauddin Naqshband, who was himself a descendant of the eleventh Imam Hasan al Askari, through his son Sayyid Ali Akbar as well as Sayyid Abdul Qadir Gilani through his grandmother. Hazrat Ishaan Saheb is also known to have a familiary relationship with the Sufi saint Farid ul-din Attar and Khwaja Ubaidullah Ahrar. Khwaja Ahrar was his ancestor, which also indicates Hazrat Ishaans descent from Caliph Umar ibn Al Khattab

Maternal descendance 
From his maternal line Hazrat Ishaan is of Hashimi descent from two lines. One line is linked to Imam Hussein though his maternal grandfather Mirak ibn Zayn ul Abideen. Another line is linked to Imam Muhammad Ibn al Hanafiyyah.

Biography

Family 
Hazrat Ishaan was the second son of Khwaja Sayyid Mir Sharif Naqshbandi. His older brother was Khwaja Khawand Muhammad Naqshbandi, known as Khwaja Khawand Aftab, who also was a saint. Hazrat Ishaan had issued 5 daughters and 6 sons, who are all regarded as saints.

Lineage 
Hazrat Ishaan was a descendant of Islamic prophet Muhammad.

Spiritual journey 
Hazrat Ishaan was influenced by his ancestors´ teachings and was therefore a disciple of his father. Hazat Ishaan was granted permission from his father to study in a royal college and had become an accomplished scholar. In the age of 23 years Hazrat Ishaan Shah Saheb has received a letter to visit his father and to accompany him in his last days. Upon his father, passing away, he abandoned further studies and concentrated on the mystical quest. In this he first left to Wakhsh, where he became Shaykh ul Islam, performing his duties there. While staying in Wakhsh, he got to know Khwaja Hajji. They have met a second time in Balkh, where Khwaja Hajji has introduced him to his future master Khwaja Ishaq Dahbidi and has become his disciple. He met him the second time in Bokhara and has become his disciple. After twelve years of spiritual training Hazrat Ishaan Saheb has reached the level of a Shaykh in Tasawuff in year 1598. Khwaja Ishaq Wali has welcomed him in his circle as the emperor of all Awliya Allah. On the order of Khwaja Ishaq Wali Hazrat Ishaan Saheb went to Lahore to propagate the Ishaqqiya path. Instead he went to Srinagar in Kashmir. In Srinagar he attracted many people, who have later followed him. The fame of his piety has reached many areas of Central Asia. Hundreds of thousands of disciples in Khorasan, modern-day Afghanistan, especially in the cities of Kandahar, Kabul and Herat, followed him. He has sent disciples in all over Central Asia under, whom 2 have been sent to Tibet. Unlike other Naqshbandi Masters he attracted many people, who were not only official patronages. Hazrat Khwaja Khawand Mahmud was invited by the Moghul Emperor Jahangir to go to his court in Agra. Going there several times, he was able to create firm connections to the court, because Jahangir was his disciple. Jahangir firmly believed in him, being taught by his father Akbar that he was born through Hazrat Ishaan´s prayers, when Akbar desperately wished to have a child. Becoming entangled in the struggle against the Shia community there, Moghul emperor Shah Jahan evacuated him in year 1636 to Delhi. Hazrat Ishaan spent his last six years in Lahore, where he Shah Jahan has built a Palace for him, that later became his mausoleum.

Succession and legacy 
Hazrat Ishaan was succeeded by his son Moinuddin Naqshabnd in Kashmir. His youngest son Bahauddin succeeded his father in Lahore in a very young age. His spiritual line died out in the late eighteenth century. Hazrat Ishaan has stated that one of his progeny will come to revive his lineage and to take his place as Ghawth. It has been found, that Hazrat Sayyid Mir Jan is this person, who is his successor in the Uwaisiyyah way.

Legacy 
In honor Hazrat Ishaan, Dakik Family also known as the House of Hazrat Ishaan are continuing his legacy. The Dakik Family are biological descendants of Hazrat Ishaan through his son Sayyid Moinuddin Hadi Naqshband, whose descendants in the line of Sayyid Kamaluddin Mirza migrated to Kabul on the occasion of another Shiite revolt, that led to Sayyid Kamaluddin Mirza and his son Sayyid Abdul Khaliq Mirza being martyred. Sayyid Mir Jan belongs to this family and is the granduncle of the family´s matriarch, that married with a Prince of the Afghan Royal Family, acting as UN Ambassador.

Spiritual rank 
Hazrat Ishaan was Qutb the highest ranking Wali Allah (saint) of his time. In Sufism the Qutb is known as the cosmic leader of the whole universe and righteous successor of Muhammad. It is said that Hazrat Ishaan stated that under his progeny there will come a son of him, who will revive the spiritual lineage and legacy of Hazrat Ishaan and who will take his place as Qutb after him. It is accepted that the miraculous and prophesied successor was Sayyid ul Sadaat Hazrat Sayyid Mir Jan.

Gallery

See also 
Abdul Qadir Jilani
Sultan Sadaat Sayyid Ali Akbar
Ali Hujwiri
Bahauddin Naqshband
Moinuddin Chishti
Ziyarat Naqshband Sahab
Moinuddin Hadi Naqshband
Sayyid Mir Jan
Sayyid Mahmud Agha

External links 
 www.hazrat-ishaan.com

References 

17th-century Muslim scholars of Islam
Family of Muhammad
Hashemite people
Sufi religious leaders
Sufi saints
Naqshbandi order
Sufi mystics
1563 births
1642 deaths
People of Arab descent